Paul Taylor (born 20 June 1959 in Enfield, Middlesex) is a former English football referee, who also took charge of Premier League matches in 2000-2001 before reverting to the Football League. He also officiated in UEFA and FIFA competitions. He subsequently re-located to Hertfordshire.

Career
He first began refereeing in 1977 and progressed via the Hertfordshire County League, the Isthmian League and the Panel League Competitions.

He was appointed as a Football League assistant referee in 1986 and promoted to referee in 1990. At this point he was aged only thirty and the youngest member on the List. The majority of his appointments over the next three seasons were in the lower divisions.

Taylor refereed the Hertfordshire Senior County Cup Final, the FA Sunday Cup Final and several international matches at both Youth and semi-professional level. He also officiated in the Football League play-offs on six occasions including the League Two Final at the Millennium Stadium, Cardiff, in 2006.

Other notable appointments included refereeing Cheltenham Town's first game in the Football League and Southampton's last match at The Dell versus Arsenal.

His overseas appointments included the 2000-01 UEFA Champions League third qualifying round fixture between Dynamo Kiev and Red Star Belgrade. Taylor refereed his first senior FIFA International between Nigeria and Venezuela in August 2003. In 2004, he was fourth official at the FA Trophy Final. In the same year, he retired from international refereeing due to age restrictions. In 2005, he became a County Accredited Referees Instructor and in 2006 qualified as a National Licensed Instructor.

The 2007–08 season was due to be his final one as a League referee before retirement, however after appealing the decision to remove him from the National List of referees because of age, he was included for the 2008-2009 and 2009–2010 seasons. He refereed the Ipswich v Preston match on the opening day of the 2008-2009 Championship season.

His final fixture was the League One match between Wycombe Wanderers and Gillingham on 8 May 2010. He now works as a Referee Coach for the Professional Game Match Officials Ltd.

References

Print

Football League Handbooks, 1986–89
Rothmans / Sky Sports Football Yearbooks, 1990–2006

Internet

External links
 Paul Taylor Referee Statistics at soccerbase.com

1959 births
English football referees
Premier League referees
People from Enfield, London
Living people